Socialism in Canada has a long history and along with conservatism and liberalism is a political force in Canada.

In its early days, Canada's socialist movement gained momentum in Western Canada. The Socialist Labor Party was formed in 1898 in Vancouver. The Socialist Party of British Columbia in 1901. The Socialist Party of Canada was the first Canadian-wide based Socialist party by native Canadians, founded in 1904. Later, the Winnipeg General Strike of 1919 and Great Depression (1929–1939) are considered to have fuelled socialism in Canada. The Communist Party of Canada was founded in 1920 and is the oldest active socialist party in Canada, and the second-oldest active political party in Canada.

The Co-operative Commonwealth Federation (CCF) was founded in 1932 as an agrarian socialist party. Its first platform was the Regina Manifesto, adopted in 1930. The CCF gained popularity among industrial workers throughout the 1930s. In 1944, the Saskatchewan wing of the party formed the first Socialist government in a Canadian party and stayed in power until 1964.

The New Democratic Party (NDP) was founded in 1961, as a merger of the CCF and the interests of the Canadian Labour Congress. At the end of a five-day-long Founding Convention which established its principles, policies and structures, and Tommy Douglas, the long-time CCF Premier of Saskatchewan, was elected its first leader. While the NDP has never won a federal election, its provincial wings have taken power in six out of ten provinces since its inception. In the preamble of its original constitution, the NDP self-described as a socialist party. Since 2013, the party constitution states that "social democracy and democratic socialism are influences on the party".

History

Early 20th century socialism
The Socialist Labor Party was Canada's first socialist party, formed in 1898 by Canadian supporters of the ideas of American socialist Daniel De Leon and the Socialist Labor Party of America. It became a national party in the 1930s and had its headquarters in Toronto. The party never won any seats. The party ran only a small number of candidates (listed below), all of whom placed last in their respective elections.

The Socialist Party of Canada (SPC) existed from 1904 to 1925 led by E. T. Kingsley. It published the Western Clarion newspaper. The party was founded at the Socialist Party of British Columbia's 4th annual convention in December 1904. The SPC was instrumental in setting up One Big Union in Canada.  The SPC strongly oppose participation in World War I. As a result of the Russian Revolution and the Winnipeg General Strike, a number of the SPC's supporters became attracted to Bolshevism and the ideas of Vladimir Lenin and Leon Trotsky. The party disbanded in 1925.

Communism 

During the Great Depression, the Communist Party of Canada experienced a brief surge in popularity, becoming influential in various labour unions and electing a single Member of Parliament, Fred Rose. The Communist Party of Canada was created in Guelph, Ontario in 1921 by a group of Marxist activists led by William Moriarty. During the early years of their existence, the party's membership faced persecution and arrest for their political activities. In 1935 the Communists gained notoriety by organizing a massive march of unemployed workers known as the On-to-Ottawa Trek and before that organized the young inmates of the relief camps into the Relief Camp Workers' Union to resist the poor conditions of the camps. The On-to-Ottawa Trek never made it to Ottawa; instead, it ended with the Regina Riot of July 1, 1935. The trek and the living conditions in the government's "relief camps" helped to discredit Conservative Prime Minister R. B. Bennett, leading to his defeat at the hands of the Liberals in 1935. After the trek the communists were instrumental in organizing over 1,448 Canadians to fight in the Spanish Civil War.

Joined by volunteers of other political stripes, the Canadian contingent known as the Mackenzie-Papineau Battalion joined the International Brigades (a coalition of volunteers from many countries) to fight for the elected leftwing government of the Second Spanish Republic against the fascist-supported insurgency of General Francisco Franco. The "Mac-Paps" fought bravely in many battles but were forced to leave Spain in 1938 by Prime Minister Juan Negrín López along with the other foreign volunteers as it became clear that the war was lost. Of the nearly 1,500 Canadians known to have fought in Spain, 721 were verified as having lost their lives. The most famous Canadian to serve in the Mackenzie–Papineau Battalion was Dr. Norman Bethune, a surgeon who would invent the world's first mobile medical unit. Dr. Bethune would later be killed during the Second Sino-Japanese War, while aiding the Chinese Communist Party. Today, he is a national hero in the People's Republic of China and is remembered as being a friend of Chinese leader Mao Zedong.

By the end of World War II, the Communist Party began to lose its momentum. Its only elected federal representative, Fred Rose, was accused of being a Soviet spy. Rose was expelled from parliament, arrested for four years, and then followed at every job site by the Royal Canadian Mounted Police (RCMP). He eventually left for Poland with the intention of returning to clear his name, but had his Canadian citizenship revoked in 1957.

Democratic socialism 

By a wide margin, the Co-operative Commonwealth Federation (CCF), a democratic socialist political party from the Prairies with its origins in the Christian left and the social gospel, became the most influential socialist party in Canada.

The CCF gained support in the Prairies as well as from many labour unions. Led by Tommy Douglas, the CCF was elected to power during the 1944 Saskatchewan election. Douglas governed Saskatchewan until 1961. As of the 2019, his party remains an important force in the politics of the province. The CCF also emerged as the official opposition in British Columbia during the election of 1941 and in Ontario during the province's 1943 election. At the federal level, opinion polls initially indicated a dramatic surge in support for the CCF prior to the 1945 federal election. Although in the end it only translated into modest gains for the party, it is widely believed to have influenced the early steps taken by Prime Minister William Lyon Mackenzie King in introducing the welfare state. The CCF and the early democratic socialist movement is seen, by some political scientists (such as Gad Horowitz), as mainly a Christian and European Canadian movement.

In 1961, the CCF joined with the Canadian Labour Congress to form the New Democratic Party (NDP). The NDP is more moderate and social-democratic than its predecessor, the CCF. The Regina Manifesto of the CCF called for abolishing capitalism while the NDP merely wants to reform capitalism. They are generally perceived as being responsible for the creation of universal healthcare, pensions, a human rights code and for the development of Canada's social safety net in general. In the past, the NDP has formed provincial governments in Alberta, British Columbia, Yukon Territory, Saskatchewan, Manitoba, Ontario, and Nova Scotia. The NDP government created a public auto insurance company upon taking power in Saskatchewan, Manitoba and British Columbia. At present only British Columbia has a New Democratic government, while the NDP is the official opposition in Alberta, Saskatchewan, Manitoba, Ontario, and Yukon. 

At the federal level the NDP has held strong influence over various minority governments, in particular a Liberal minority led by Pierre Trudeau from 1972-1974 during the 29th Canadian Parliament. During this period the NDP was successful in forcing the government to create a state-owned oil company, called Petro Canada.

The NDP has also held influence over other Liberal-led minority governments during the Lester B. Pearson government (1963–1968) and the Paul Martin government (2004–2006). Their self-stated goal is to one day form a federal government on their own and introduce social-democratic policies.

In the province of Quebec, the NDP has been considerably less popular, but recently, in the May 2, 2011 Canadian Federal Election a record number of NDP Members of Parliament were elected, including 59 of the 75 available seats in Quebec. The party was the Official Opposition in the 41st Canadian Parliament.

For most of the late 20th century, the strongest social-democratic party in Quebec has been the sovereigntist Parti Québécois. Like the NDP, the Parti Québécois is generally considered to be "social democratic".

Revolutionary socialism 
Many socialists in Canada have attempted to organize outside of the framework of parliamentary politics, to pursue conceptions of socialism that are more radical than the social-democratic politics of either the CCF or the NDP.

Some of the radical socialist organizations operating in Canada today include Socialist Action (Canada) the International Socialists (Canada), Socialist Alternative (Canada), Spring, the Communist League (Canada), Autonomy & Solidarity, and the London Project for a Participatory Society, among others.

Socialist parties in Canada

Current parties 
 The New Democratic Party, (NDP) is a federal political party which officially adheres to social democracy while still being one of the most left-wing of Canada's mainstream parties. However, a minority faction are committed to democratic socialism, including, but not restricted to, the radical Socialist Caucus. The policies of various provincial and territorial branches of the NDP have varied in the past from the left-wing to the third way. The party's youth group is known as the New Democratic Youth of Canada. The provincial branches of the NDP are:
 Yukon New Democratic Party - official opposition
 British Columbia New Democratic Party - governing party
 Alberta New Democratic Party - official opposition
 Saskatchewan New Democratic Party - official opposition
 New Democratic Party of Manitoba - official opposition
 Ontario New Democratic Party - official opposition
 New Democratic Party of Newfoundland and Labrador - third party
 Nova Scotia New Democratic Party - third party
 New Brunswick New Democratic Party - not represented in the legislature
 New Democratic Party of Prince Edward Island - not represented in the legislature
 The Communist Party of Canada sees itself as being "Canada's party of socialism" and with its origins going back to 1921 the CPC is the second oldest existing political party in Canada after the Liberal Party of Canada. The Communist Party has active branches in Alberta, Ontario, Manitoba, Saskatchewan, and British Columbia. In Quebec there was a split in 2006 between a separatist and federalist faction in the Communist Party of Quebec. The PCQ is now led by Andre Parizeau the leader of the separatist faction, while the party's federalists have regrouped into the PCC/PCQ and are tied to the federal party. The CPC also has a youth group, known as the Young Communist League of Canada.
 The Communist Party of Canada (Marxist–Leninist) was created in 1971 as a so-called Anti-Revisionist party supportive of Maoism and of Albanian leader Enver Hoxha. Today the ideology of the CPC (ML) or Marxist-Leninist Party of Canada is less doctrinaire than in the past but still considered more radical than that of the Communist Party of Canada. They support radically changing the way candidates are nominated and elected and are generally supportive of North Korea. Their members are active in the Canadian Union of Postal Workers and United Steelworkers of America. The CPC (ML) has active provincial branches in British Columbia (the People's Front), Manitoba, Ontario and in Quebec (the Parti marxiste-léniniste du Québec).
 Revolutionary Communist Party is a communist organization advocating the overthrow of the capitalist system. It is in the organizing stage. The ideology of the organization, founded in 2000, can be regarded as anti-revisionist in character. They describe their ideology as "Marxism-Leninism-Maoism" which they consider the third phase of Marxism. The group does not take part in electoral politics, instead aiming to educate the working class about the need for a revolution in the style of the Russian and Chinese revolutions. The PRC-RCP is non-collaborationist and opposes all Canadian political parties, including ones calling themselves communist.
 Québec Solidaire ("Solidarity Quebec") is Quebec's most popular left-wing party. They claim to be devoted to the causes of democratic socialism, such as environmentalism, feminism, Quebec Sovereignty and alter-globalization. They have gained support amongst left-wing sovereigntist voters who are disillusioned with the Parti Québécois' embrace of neoliberalism.
 Socialist Party of Canada (WSM) formed in 1931 publishes a journal called Imagine and is a companion party of the World Socialist Movement.
 Fightback, the Canadian section of the Trotskyist organization called the International Marxist Tendency publishes a self-titled newspaper and practices Entryism in Quebec Solidaire and the NDP

Historical parties 
Parties that have held seats in the House of Commons of Canada and provincial legislatures.
 Canadian Labour Party (1917–1942)
 Ginger Group (1924–1932) was a group of radical members of the Progressive Party of Canada
 United Farmers – farmer advocacy groups tied to the Progressive Party of Canada. In Ontario, the United Farmers of Ontario governed from 1919 to 1924 with a fairly social democratic agenda, while the United Farmers of Alberta governed Alberta from 1921 to 1930 following more conservative guidelines.
 Socialist Party of Canada was a name used by two political parties. The first existed from 1905 to 1925 and was created by the Socialist Party of British Columbia; it played an important role in the creation of the CCF. The second has existed since 1931 and has been very marginal in terms of support.
 Labor-Progressive Party was the name used by the Communist Party of Canada from 1941 to 1959 while it was an illegal party. The LPP followed a Marxist line and succeeded in not only electing a member of the House of Commons, but also electing representatives to the Legislative Assembly of Manitoba and the Legislative Assembly of Ontario.
 Co-operative Commonwealth Federation (1932–1962) – known as the CCF, it was, before the NDP, Canada's most popular left-wing party. The CCF was formed during The Great Depression by members of the centrist Progressive Party of Canada (the Ginger Group), the United Farmers, the Labour Party and a social advocacy group known as the League for Social Reconstruction. At the party's first convention in Regina, Saskatchewan, the Regina Manifesto was launched announcing that: "No CCF Government will rest content until it has eradicated capitalism and put into operation the full programme of socialized planning which will lead to the establishment in Canada of the Co-operative Commonwealth." The radical Regina Manifesto was replaced by the more moderate Winnipeg Declaration in 1956. The CCF went on to form one of Canada's most popular and historically significant provincial governments in 1944 in the Canadian province of Saskatchewan under Tommy Douglas. In Ontario the CCF formed the official opposition in 1943 and again in 1948 until losing that position to the Liberals. In British Columbia the CCF also formed the official opposition after 1941. Federally the party never got past third place and in an attempt to broaden their support base the CCF merged with the Canadian Labour Congress to create the NDP.
 Cape Breton Labour Party was a social-democratic party from the province of Nova Scotia represented in the Nova Scotia legislature from 1981–1988 by a former NDP member Paul MacEwan.
 New Democratic Party of Quebec was the Quebec wing of the NDP. The Quebec NDP failed to win any significant support or win any seats in the Quebec legislature (its parent party, the Quebec CCF won one). After years of infighting in 1989, the party broke off relations with the federal NDP and in 1994 changed its name to the Parti de la Democratie Socialiste (PDS) or "Socialist Democratic Party". The PDS adopted a program calling for Quebec's separation from Canada and had attempted to nominate a former terrorist, Paul Rose (formerly of the FLQ) as a federal candidate. The PDS contested the 1998 Quebec election without any success. In 2002 the PDS joined the Communist Party of Quebec and other far left, sovereigntist parties in an alliance known as the Union des forces progressistes (UFP). In 2006 the UFP became Quebec solidaire.

See also 
 Democratic Socialists Of Canada
 Anarchism in Canada
 Conservatism in Canada
 Douglas-Coldwell Foundation
 Fascism in Canada
 History of Canada
 History of socialism
 League for Social Reconstruction
 Liberalism in Canada
 Monarchism in Canada
 Politics of Canada
 Republicanism in Canada

References

Bibliography 
 Berton, Pierre (2001). The Great Depression 1929-1939. Anchor Canada.
 Horowitz, Gad (1968). Canadian Labour in Politics.

External links 
 A new brand of Canadian Social Democracy, CBC Archives
 The Canadian Encyclopedia:Social Democracy
 The Canadian Encyclopedia:Co-operative Commonwealth Federation
 Regina Manifesto
 History of the Communist Party of Canada During the "Hungry Thirties"
 Dr. Norman Bethune Institute
 "In Memory of Norman Bethune" by Mao Zedong

 
Political history of Canada
Political movements in Canada
Social democracy
Democratic socialism
Canada